Nassarius delicatus is a species of sea snail, a marine gastropod mollusc in the family Nassariidae, the Nassa mud snails or dog whelks.

Description
The length of the shell varies between 6 mm and 14 mm.

Distribution
This species occurs in the Red Sea, in the Indo-West Pacific and off La Réunion.

References

 Cernohorsky W. O. (1984). Systematics of the family Nassariidae (Mollusca: Gastropoda). Bulletin of the Auckland Institute and Museum 14: 1–356. 
 Vine, P. (1986). Red Sea Invertebrates. Immel Publishing, London. 224 pp

External links
 

Nassariidae
Gastropods described in 1852